St Botolph without Aldgate was an ancient parish in the metropolitan area of London. The parish was partly within the City of London and partly in the County of Middlesex. Each part operated as a separate parish for civil administration with its own local government, but it was a single parish for ecclesiastical purposes. The part in Middlesex was sometimes known as East Smithfield. It was a heavily built-upon parish with a high population density.

Within the City
The section of the parish in the City of London was in the Portsoken ward.

Following the enactment of the London Government Act 1899, the part of the parish of Whitechapel that was within the City of London was transferred to St Botolph without Aldgate in 1900.

The City of London section of the parish was abolished in 1907 when the City of London civil parish was created.

Outside the City
Civil parish administration was in the hands of the vestry until 1855 when the parish was grouped into the Whitechapel District and the parish elected six members to Whitechapel District Board of Works. The parish was transferred from the County of Middlesex to the County of London in 1889.

In 1895 it absorbed the civil parishes of St Katherine by the Tower and Old Tower Without. In 1901 it absorbed the civil parish of the Tower of London.

It became part of the Metropolitan Borough of Stepney in 1900 and the local authority became Stepney Borough Council. The civil parish then had only nominal existence until 1921 when it was abolished.

References

Parishes united into districts (Metropolis)
Former civil parishes in London
History of the London Borough of Tower Hamlets
Bills of mortality parishes